
Urqunqucha (Quechua urqu male; mountain, -n a suffix, qucha lake, "male's lake" or "lake of the mountain", also spelled Orconcocha) is a lake in the Cordillera Blanca in the Andes of Peru. Urqunqucha is located in the Ancash Region, Mariscal Luzuriaga Province, Lucma District, east of the peak of Pukarahu (Quechua for "red mountain").

References 

Lakes of Peru
Lakes of Ancash Region